Heracleides was a sculptor of ancient Greece, from Phocis, of whom nothing more is known.

Notes

Ancient Greek sculptors
Ancient Phocians